Joseph Magandaazi Yiga is a Ugandan businessman and entrepreneur. He is the managing director and chief executive officer of Jomayi Property Consultants Limited, a leading, real estate and development company based in Kampala, Uganda's capital and largest city. He is reported to be one of the wealthiest individuals in Uganda, with net assets of approximately US$10 million as of January 2012.

Background
He was born in the Central Region of Uganda, sometime in the mid to late 1950s.

Career
After several odd jobs, including as a telephone booth operator, Yiga founded Jomayi in 1997, naming the company from the first two letters of each of his three names. Jomayi Property Consultants Limited maintains its headquarters in a building that the company wholly owns, at 20 Old Kampala Road, on Kampala Hill, in Uganda's capital, Kampala.

As of December 2013, Jomayi has developed nearly 100 residential housing estates, where it buys acreage in bulk, brings utilities (electricity, water and sewerage) to the location, subdivides the land into plots, and sells those to interested end-users. As the property development function has prospered, Jomayi has formed other businesses to complement its business; in the process, forming the Jomayi Group of Companies. Companies in the Group include the following:
 Jomayi Construction Company – Founded in 2007 to construct houses for clients who were finding it hard to engage honest, reputable builders.
 Jomayi Water Company Limited – A water supply company in Mukono District.
 Jomayi Hardware Centre Limited – Founded in 2011.
 Jomayi Paints Limited – Supplier of locally made and imported house paints. Founded in 2012.
 St. Josephat Secondary School – Located at Kabaga, Kitagobwa in Mpererwe.

See also

References

External links
  Webpage of Jomayi Property Consultants Limited
   Real Estate Paying Price for Slow Oil Sector Activity

Living people
1957 births
Ganda people
Ugandan businesspeople in real estate